Terence Kearley, 3rd Viscount Devonport  (born 29 August 1944), is a British peer.

Viscount Devonport was educated at Aiglon College in Switzerland, Selwyn College, Cambridge (BA, DipArch) and Newcastle University (BPhil). He was an architect by profession.

He sat in the House of Lords from 1973 until 1999 when he lost his seat after the passing of the House of Lords Act 1999.

References

External links 

 www.burkespeerage.com

1944 births
Alumni of Selwyn College, Cambridge
Living people
Viscounts in the Peerage of the United Kingdom

Devonport
Alumni of Newcastle University
Alumni of Aiglon College